Mukim Kianggeh is a mukim in Brunei-Muara District, Brunei. The population was 8,228 in 2016. The mukim encompasses Pusat Bandar, the city centre of the capital Bandar Seri Begawan.

Name 
The mukim is named after Kampong Kianggeh, one of the villages it encompasses.

Geography 
The mukim is located in the central part of the district, bordering Mukim Berakas 'A' and Mukim Berakas 'B' to the north, Mukim Kota Batu to the east and south, the mukims within Kampong Ayer and Mukim Lumapas to the south, Mukim Kilanas to the south-west and Mukim Gadong 'B' to the west.

Demographics 
As of 2016 census, the population was 8,228 with  males and  females. The mukim had 2,140 households occupying 2,104 dwellings. The entire population lived in urban areas.

Villages 
As of 2016, the mukim comprised the following census villages:

Notes

References 

Kianggeh
Brunei-Muara District